Antonov is a rural locality (a khutor) and the administrative center of Antonovskoye Rural Settlement, Oktyabrsky District, Volgograd Oblast, Russia. The population was 1,654 as of 2010. There are 34 streets.

Geography 
Antonov is located in Yergeny, on the Aksay Yesaulovsky River, 4 km northwest of Oktyabrsky (the district's administrative centre) by road. Oktyabrsky is the nearest rural locality.

References 

Rural localities in Oktyabrsky District, Volgograd Oblast